Olaf Jacob Martin Luther Breda Bull (10 November 1883 – 29 June 1933) was a Norwegian poet. He was nominated for the Nobel Prize in Literature six times.

Biography
Olaf Bull was born in Kristiania (now Oslo), Norway. His parents were author Jacob Breda Bull 
(1853–1930) and his second wife Maria Augusta Berglöf (1854–1922). Bull grew up and was mostly raised in Kristiania. At the age of 13, he lived for some time in Hurum in Buskerud, where his father worked as a journalist and editor. In 1899, he started gymnasium at Aars og Voss' skole. He attended Kristiania Cathedral School prior to his graduation from private school in 1902. After his graduation he lived with his family in Rome before returning to Kristiania in 1903 to begin his studies at the university.

Olaf Bull could be considered a polymath because in addition to both modern and classical literature, he mastered philosophy, history, politics, art and science. He spent several years as a journalist for Posten and Dagbladet . He was known as the “Oslo-poet,” but he lived for extended periods in both Italy and in France where his son, poet Jan Bull (1927–1985) was born.

Olaf Bull was married three times and divorced twice. Economic issues coupled with abuse of alcohol had a strong impact on his life. He had a nervous disposition and developed signs of depression. His last year was characterized by illness and alcoholism. He had physical ailments, including partial paralysis and liver damage. Olaf Bull died at age 49 at Ullevål Hospital in Oslo. His urn was placed at Vår Frelsers gravlund.

His poetry
Bull's poetry collection Digte (Poems) (1909) formed the foundation upon which he came to be recognized as Norway's foremost poet. Olaf Bull composed his poetry using what is called in Norwegian sentrallyrikk — poems about “central themes” such as love, sorrow and death. He used fixed stanza patterns and was known for his strong and emotional depictions. His poetry and work conveys a melancholy sense that all is transitory. In spite of this disconsolate tone, his recurring and powerful use of mood, faultless form and expressive voice communicate his belief that, although evanescent, art and beauty are important.

Giovanni Bach described his work in this way:
"His poems reveal a masculine power and a forceful affirmation of his own individuality, notwithstanding the extreme pessimism that often envelopes them in a voluminous thick black veil. His poetry is deeply felt, rich in imaginative and intellectual quality."

Bull utilized his extensive knowledge and artistic strength, but showed an underlying fear and depression. Olaf Bull was known to be anti-authority and was regarded an “outsider” in society, but his poetry demonstrated that he never totally broke with traditional form and structure. Much of his poetry showed a powerful longing for the eternal and persistent. This longing was most apparent when he wrote about classical motifs.

Bull and Joyce
While James Joyce was working on Finnegans Wake, he wanted to insert references to Scandinavian languages and literature, hiring five teachers of Norwegian. Bull was the first one. Joyce wanted to read Norwegian works in the original language, including Peter Andreas Munch's Norrøne Gude- og Heltesagn (Norse Tales of Gods and Heroes). He was looking for puns and weird associations across the barriers of language, which was something Bull well understood. Lines from Bull's poems echo through "this spider's web of words", as Joyce himself called Finnegans Wake, and Bull himself materializes under the name "Olaph the Oxman", a pun on his surname.

In his letters home, Bull mentioned nothing about Joyce, most likely because he often asked his family for money, which would sound unconvincing with him at the same time being a teacher for a world-famous author. It is not known how Joyce got in contact with Bull, but both frequented the bookstore Shakespeare and Company in Paris which was run by Sylvia Beach, who may have brought them in contact with each other. In 1926 Ulysses was issued as an unlicensed copy in the United States, meaning that Joyce would receive no money for it. Together with Beach he wrote a protest letter, intending it to be signed by well-known writers from the whole of Europe. Beach mentions in her memoirs that Joyce was particularly eager to have Bull sign it. Beach tracked Bull, who had left Paris to live in the French countryside. On behalf of Joyce she sent a man there to have the protest signed. Bull's wife Suzanne provided him with a copy of Bull's signature.

Bibliography

Works published during his lifetime
 Digte (Poems), Gyldendal, 1909
 Nye Digte (New Poems), Gyldendal, 1913
 Mitt navn er Knoph (My Name is Knoph), Narveson, 1914
 Digte og noveller (Poems and Short Stories), Gyldendal, 1916
 Samlede digte 1909–1919 (Collected Poems), Gyldendal, 1919
 Stjernerne (Stars), Gyldendal, 1924
 Metope, Gyldendal, 1927
 De hundrede aar (The Hundred Years), Gyldendal, 1928
 Kjærlighet (Love), Gyldendal, 1929
 Oinos og Eros, Gyldendal, 1930
 Ignis ardens, Gyldendal, 1932

Play
 Kjærlighetens farse:tre akter (Love's Farce: Three Acts), Aschehoug, 1919, published 1948. Written together with Helge Krog.

Posthumously published works 
 Ekko og regnbue: notater fra en dikters verksted (Echo and Rainbow: Notes From a Poet's Workplace), Gyldendal, 1987. Edited by Frans Lasson.
 Olaf Bull: brev fra en dikters liv (Olaf Bull: Letters from a Poets Life), 2 vols., Gyldendal, 1989. Edited by Frans Lasson
 Ild og skygger: spredte notater fra et dikterliv (Fire and Shadows: Scattered Notes from a Poet's Life), Nørhaven, Viborg, 1991. Edited by Frans Lasson

References

Other sources 
 Suzanne Bull (1974) Ni år: mitt liv med Olaf Bull (Oslo: Aschehoug) 
 Nete Smith, ed. (2004) Twentieth Century Norwegian Writers (Gale Dictionary of Literary Biography, vol. 297) 
Fredrik Wandrup (1995)  Olaf Bull og hans samtid. En uro som aldri dør. (Oslo: Gyldendal)

External links
 Olaf Bull, a wretched giant of Scandinavian literature (Petter Næss, 1990)

1883 births
1933 deaths
Writers from Oslo
People educated at Oslo Cathedral School
Norwegian male poets
19th-century Norwegian poets
20th-century Norwegian poets
19th-century Norwegian male writers
20th-century Norwegian male writers
Burials at the Cemetery of Our Saviour
20th-century Norwegian journalists